Ortrun Wenkel (born 25 October 1942) is a German operatic contralto. She notably portrayed the role of Erda in the Bayreuth Jahrhundertring (Centenary Ring) in 1976 and was awarded a Grammy Award as a Principal Soloist in 1983.

Career 
Wenkel was born in Buttstädt, Thuringia.  She started her studies at the Hochschule für Musik Franz Liszt, Weimar. Following her emigration from East Germany to West Germany, she continued at the Frankfurt University of Music and Performing Arts with Paul Lohmann (masterclass) and then with Elsa Cavelti.

She began her career in 1964 as concert and oratorio soloist when she was still a student. She dedicated herself to Baroque music, and appeared at major international festivals (English Bach Festival, Festival du Marais, Flandern Festival, Holland Festival) and for concerts at the Salle Pleyel (Paris), the Royal Festival Hall (London), Tonhalle (Zürich) and the Wiener Musikvereinssaal. However, she decided then also to turn to a stage career. In 1971, she made her stage debut at the municipal theatre of Heidelberg in the title role of Orpheus by Gluck. In 1975, she became a member of the Bayerische Staatsoper where she caught the attention of Wolfgang Wagner who immediately engaged her for Erda in Richard Wagners Ring des Nibelungen at the Bayreuth Festival 1976 Jahrhundertring (Centenary Ring) in 1976, celebrating the centenary of both the festival and the first performance of the complete cycle, conducted by Pierre Boulez and staged by Patrice Chéreau, recorded and filmed in 1979 and 1980. For her performance of Erda (Rheingold, Siegfried) and First Norn (Götterdämmerung) in this production she was awarded 1982 a Grammy as "a Principal Soloist".

Wenkel appeared at many important opera houses of the world (Deutsche Oper Berlin, Opéra Garnier Paris, Milan Scala, Royal Opera London, as well as Rome, the opera houses of Munich, Stuttgart, Zurich, Geneva, Lisboa, Venice, Prague, among others), concert halls include the Berlin Philharmonie, Concertgebouw Amsterdam, Accademia di Santa Cecilia Rome, Teatro Colón Buenos Aires, Kennedy Center Washington and Carnegie Hall New York. Since her concert debut 1964, Wenkel is continuously performing, and she worked with many of the most prominent conductors, e. g. Pierre Boulez, Riccardo Chailly, Colin Davis, Christoph von Dohnányi, Christoph Eschenbach, Bernard Haitink, Marek Janowski, Erich Leinsdorf, Gerd Albrecht, Riccardo Muti, Václav Neumann, Seiji Ozawa, Giuseppe Sinopoli, Gabriel Chmura, Michael Hofstetter, Ulf Schirmer and Klaus Tennstedt. During the past years, she had several noteworthy role debuts, e. g. Fricka, Waltraute at the Graz Opera, Klytämnestra (Richard Strauss' Elektra) at the Budapest Spring Festival and Freiburg, 2002/2003 the title role in Aribert Reimann's Bernarda Albas Haus in the Swiss First Night at the Bern Opera, and 2012 Filipjewna (Eugen Onegin) at the Staatstheater Saarbrücken. Besides the classical-romantic repertoire of operas, oratorio, and Lieder, Wenkel dedicated herself also towards works of contemporary music, working together with Hans Werner Henze, Kryzsztof Penderecki and Aribert Reimann. Hans Werner Henze composed for her the revision of Richard Wagner's Wesendonck Lieder for alto and chamber orchestra, and she performed the premiere under his direction at the Westdeutscher Rundfunk in 1977. Wenkel is also renowned for giving recitals all over the world, accompanied e. g. by Geoffrey Parsons, Rudolf Jansen, Phillip Moll, Erik Werba, Wilhelm von Grunelius, Cord Garben, Helge Dorsch, Burkhard Schaeffer and Felix-Jany Renz.

Reviews 

 On 19 April 1971, The Daily Telegraph London wrote about Ortrun Wenkels concert in the English Bach Festival: "Each of the soloists sang with some command here but outstanding was the splendid young contralto Ortrun Wenkel, who produced the liveliest and most committed solo of the evening."
 In September 1981, Speight Jenkins wrote in Record World, New York, about the recording of Das Rheingold with Ortrun Wenkel (Erda), Siegmund Nimsgern (Alberich), Theo Adam (Wotan), Peter Schreier (Loge), Lucia Popp (Woglinde), Yvonne Minton (Fricka) and the Staatskapelle Dresden under the direction of Marek Janowski, recorded 1980 in Dresden: "Of the singers the best by far is Ortrun Wenkel, the Erda. She levels her competition on all the other sets. This is a great Erda, a true contralto Mother Earth who inspires terror and commands with authority."
 On 16 October 1984, Donal Henahan wrote in The New York Times about the performance of Ivan Susanin by Mikhail Glinka in Carnegie Hall, New York, with Ortrun Wenkel (Vanya), Martti Talvela (Susanin) and Chris Merritt (Sobinin): "So did Miss Wenkel, a spunky mezzo with a particularly solid lower register. Easily the most spirited and imaginative actor in the cast, she almost managed to make one take an interest in the intrepid Vanya, Susain's adopted son."
 On 14 March 1986, Pierre Petit of Le Figaro wrote about the performance of Gustav Mahler's Kindertotenlieder with the Orchestre de Paris, conducted by Erich Leinsdorf. "It was Ortrun Wenkel who sang these five great and beautiful songs. A voice of remarkable harmony over a range of two octaves, of warm and dark coulour, keeping the same virtues all over in addition to a quite natural sense of phrasing serving the line of the melody without ever damaging her luminous pronunciation."
 In May 1986, Bill Zakariasen wrote in the Daily News, New York, about Richard Strauss' Daphne at the Richard Strauss Festival (Carnegie Hall, New York) with Catherine Malfitano (Daphne) and Wenkel (Gaea): "Ortrun Wenkel's super-contralto voice was an ideal fit for the earth-goddess Gaea – probably the lowest female role in opera."

Selected recordings 
 Vivaldi: Psaume 126 "Nisi Dominus", Carissimi: Canzone "No, non si speri", Caldara: Air de Cantate "Mirti, faggi, tronchi", Monteverdi: Lamento d'Arianna; Ortrun Wenkel, Orchestra PRO ARTE München, Conductor: Kurt Redel (LP 1975, Arion, Paris 1976/1979)
 J. S. Bach: St. Matthew Passion, BWV 244; Evangelische Jugendkantorei der Pfalz, Chamber Orchestra of Heidelberg, Conductor: Heinz Markus Goettsche (1976 LP Da Camera Magna, 1997 CD Bayer Records)
 Gustav Mahler: Symphoniy No. 3 d minor; London Philharmonic Orchestra, Conductor: Klaus Tennstedt (EMI Records 1980)
 Richard Wagner: Der Ring des Nibelungen; Conductor: Pierre Boulez (1980 LP Philips/ 2005 DVD Deutsche Grammophon)
 Krzysztof Penderecki: ; NDR Chor, RIAS Kammerchor, Radio-Symphonie-Orchester Berlin, Conductor: Krzysztof Penderecki (1981, Sender Freies Berlin, LP)
 Antonín Dvořák: Stabat Mater; Czech Philharmonic Choir, Czech Philharmonic, Conductor: Wolfgang Sawallisch (1983, Supraphon)
 Dmitri Shostakovich: Symphony Nr. 14 / Six Poems by Marina Tsvetaeva, Op. 143a; Júlia Várady, Dietrich Fischer-Dieskau / Ortrun Wenkel, Concertgebouw Orchestra Amsterdam, Conductor: Bernard Haitink (1986, Decca)
 Franz Schreker: ; Radio-Symphonie-Orchester Berlin, Conductor: Karl Anton Rickenbacher (1986, Koch Records)
 Wolfgang Amadeus Mozart: Requiem; Concentus Musicus Wien, Conductor: Nikolaus Harnoncourt (1991, Teldec; DVD 2006, TDK, including Johann Sebastian Bach, Komm, du süße Todesstunde, BWV 161)
 Gustav Mahler: Symphony Nr. 8; Frankfurter Museumsorchester, Conductor: Michael Gielen (LP 1981 / CD 1992 Sony)
 Johann Sebastian Bach: Cantatas BWV 137 and BWV 21; Thomanerchor and Neues Bachisches Kollegium Leipzig, Conductor: Hans-Joachim Rotzsch (1994, Berlin Classics)
 Richard Wagner: Der Ring des Nibelungen; Dresdner Staatskapelle, Conductor: Marek Janowski (1982 LP, Eterna / 1983 LP Ariola-Eurodisc / 1995 CD, RCA)
 Richard Strauss: Daphne; Lucia Popp, Reiner Goldberg, Peter Schreier, Ortrun Wenkel, Kurt Moll; Chor und Symphonieorchester des Bayrischen Rundfunks, Conductor: Bernard Haitink (2011 CD EMI Classics)

References 

 Saarländisches Staatstheater GmbH, Programmheft Nr. 111 (season 2011/2012)
 Der Ring, Bayreuth 1976–1980. Kristall-Verlag, Berlin/ Hamburg 1980, .
 Karl Josef Kutsch, Leo Riemens: Großes Sängerlexikon 3rd edition. K. G. Saur, München 1999.
 Karl Strute, Theodor Doelken, Who is Who in Germany 1982–1983, Who's Who the International Red Series Verlag, 1983.
 International Who's Who in Music, 2002 (18th edition), Europa Publications, Taylor & Francis Group, 2002.
 "Vendégünk volt: Ortrun Wenkel" (Csák P. Judit, profile and interview), in: Opera élet (opera magazine), Budapest, May/June 1999)
 "Das Porträt: Ortrun Wenkel" (W. Bronnenmeyer), In: Opernwelt. 9/1975, Friedrich Berlin Verlag, Berlin 1975
 "Die Freude am Gesang nie verlieren. Ortrun Wenkel", In: Oper heute. 7/1984, Henschelverlag Kunst und Gesellschaft, Berlin 1984.
 "Das Interview: Ortrun Wenkel" (Kurt Osterwald), In: Orpheus. 6/1986, Verlag Clauspeter Koscielny, Berlin 1986.
 "Stark ruft das Lied", conversation with Ortrun Wenkel (Sieglinde Pfabigan), In: Der Neue Merker, Nr. 29, August/September 1992.
 "Sempre aperto – per tutto: Ortrun Wenkel" (Gerhart Asche), In: Opernwelt. 2/2006, Friedrich Berlin Verlag, Berlin 2006
 Marcel Prawy, Peter Dusek, Christoph Wagner-Trenkwitz: Marcel Prawy erzählt aus seinem Leben. Heyne Verlag, 1997, pp. 271, 278, 279.
 Marcel Prawy, Karin Werner-Jensen: Nun sei bedankt. Mein Richard-Wagner-Porträt. 1st ed. Goldmann Verlag, 1983.
 Otto Schwarz: Marcel Prawy: Ein großes Leben neu erzählt. 1st edition. Amalthea Verlag, 2006, pp. 135, 139.
 "Portrait in case of Ortrun Wenkel's 70th birthday" in: Opernwelt. 9/2012, Friedrich Berlin Verlag, Berlin 2012, S. 88, Jubilare.

External links

Ortrun Wenkel, Bayreuth Festival 
Photographs

1942 births
Living people
People from Buttstädt
Operatic contraltos
German operatic contraltos
German opera singers